The Simorq or Simorgh is the first hybrid car designed and produced in Iran. It was designed by students of Imam Khomeini International University  The vehicle was entered in the 3rd Iranian Machine Design Competition and ranked 1st in industrial design and technical design.

References

Cars of Iran
Plug-in hybrid vehicles
2000s cars
Subcompact cars